Save Yourselves! is a 2020 American science fiction comedy film written and directed by Alex Huston Fischer and Eleanor Wilson, and starring John Paul Reynolds and Sunita Mani. The film premiered at the 2020 Sundance Film Festival. It was released on October 2, 2020, by Bleecker Street.

Plot
Su and Jack, a 30-something millennial couple, decide to disconnect from their Internet-obsessed superficial lives in Brooklyn by turning off their phones for a week and staying at a remote cabin owned by their friend Raph. During their stay, Jack notices a fuzzy ball-like object in the den, which Su calls a "pouffe". While Jack is outside, Su secretly turns on her phone and listens to several strange voicemails from her mother about "giant rats" infesting New York City, that seem to consume ethanol. After a night of drinking, while the couple make love in front of a large window, Raph has arrived at the cabin but falls to the ground, revealing a "pouffe" behind him.

The couple awaken to find that Jack's sourdough starter is empty and their bottle of whiskey has been drained. Su realizes that both contained ethanol, and that the "pouffe" may be one of the giant rats her mother was rambling about. The couple hide upstairs and turn on their phones, finding they've lost signal but learning from various voicemails and texts that the "pouffes" are aliens which feed on ethanol, and that have invaded New York, forcing an emergency evacuation. Preparing to escape back to the city, the couple find that the aliens have drained their car's gasoline (due to its ethanol content). They find a Land Rover in the barn with a full tank of diesel, which the aliens ignore feeding on.

Driving through the woods, they come across another couple driving a truck, who are promptly killed by an alien. Recalling the alien's sustenance, Jack throws a bottle of wine at a distance to lure the alien into the woods. The scent of ethanol distracts the alien, which sprays a pheromone and hovers into the forest, clearing their path. Su and Jack hear a baby crying in the other couple's truck, and begrudgingly go back to rescue it. A woman hiding in the other truck emerges and holds them at gunpoint before driving off in the diesel-powered Land Rover, leaving the couple and the baby stranded in the woods. When the couple begin hallucinating due to the alien's pheromones, Su injects Jack and herself with two needles of epinephrine from the truck, knocking them unconscious.

They wake up to find an alien near the baby, who had crawled away while they were unconscious. When the alien shoots its proboscis at Jacks’ chest, Su grabs a knife and cuts it off, which deflates and kills the alien. In an ironic twist, it is revealed that Jack’s cell phone (stored in his breast pocket) aided in saving him from the alien attack. While climbing to a lookout point along the trail, they investigate a translucent structure growing out of the ground nearby. On discovering that their phones have regained signal, they check for information and call 911. Meanwhile, while they are distracted by their technology, the structure changes shape to trap them and the baby inside a sound-proof bubble, which gradually ascends beyond the atmosphere, revealing numerous other bubbles also rising into space from all over the Earth.

Cast
John Paul Reynolds as Jack "Jackie" Wyndam
Sunita Mani as Surina "Su" Raji
Ben Sinclair as Raph
John Early as Blake
Jo Firestone as Desi
Johanna Day as Judy
Amy Sedaris as the voice of Jack’s mother
Zenobia Shroff as the voice of Su's mother

Release
The film had its world premiere at the Sundance Film Festival on January 25, 2020. Shortly after, Bleecker Street acquired distribution rights to the film. It was released on October 2, 2020, and is available on Hulu in the United States.

Television series
A television series adaptation of the film for Hulu is in the works at Keshet Studios and Universal Television.

Critical reception
The site's critical consensus reads, "Save Yourselves! doesn't do anything unexpected with its one-joke premise -- but fortunately, that one joke turns out to be consistently funny anyway." Stephanie Zacharek from Time magazine praised the film, saying, "It takes itself just seriously enough, but not too seriously."

References

External links

2020 films
Films set in Brooklyn
American science fiction comedy films
2020 comedy films
Bleecker Street films
Alien invasions in films
2020 science fiction films
2020s science fiction comedy films
2020s English-language films
2020s American films